Strale is the name of at least three ships of the Italian Navy, and may refer to:

 , a  launched in 1900 and discarded in 1924.
 , a  launched as Euro in 1900 and renamed shortly before being discarded in 1924.
 , a  launched in 1931 and sunk in 1942.

Italian Navy ship names